Patricia "Pat" Christine Hodgell (born March 16, 1951) is an American fantasy writer and former academic. Hodgell taught in the English Department at University of Wisconsin–Oshkosh, but retired in 2006 to pursue a full-time writing career. She has won several awards for her works.

Academic career
Hodgell holds a master's in English literature and a doctorate in 19th-century English literature, both earned at the University of Minnesota. She completed her Ph.D. and subsequent dissertation on Sir Walter Scott's Ivanhoe between the publication of her first two fantasy novels, God Stalk and Dark of the Moon. She is a graduate of the Clarion and the Milford Writer's Workshops. In academia, Hodgell produced an audio-cassette-based course on science fiction and fantasy for the University of Minnesota.  She taught for many years in the English Department at University of Wisconsin–Oshkosh, but retired in 2006 to pursue a full-time writing career.  While at the University of Wisconsin, P. C. Hodgell divided her time between teaching and writing, with a strong emphasis on "anything that stirs the imagination". This included attending science fiction conventions, and hobbies such as collecting yarn, knitting, embroidering, and raising cats.

Writing

Over the years, P. C. Hodgell was published by several publishing houses.  Two of her more recent publishers, Hypatia Press and Meisha Merlin went out of business, the latter in 2007, respectively, temporarily leaving her without a venue for future works.  Her work was picked up by Baen in or shortly before 2010, who published the fifth "Jame" novel, Bound in Blood, and reissued the previous four books as a pair of omnibus editions, The God Stalker Chronicles and Seeker's Bane. Baen has also released the novels as e-books.

Series synopsis
The Kencyr books, beginning with God Stalk, focus on the three peoples of the Kencyrath, Highborn (leaders), Kendar (artisans and soldiers) and Arrin-Ken (cat-like judges).  They were brought together by the Three-Faced God to oppose the threat of chaos called Perimal Darkling 30,000 years before the events of the books. For eons the Kencyrath have waged a long retreat, seemingly abandoned by their god, awaiting the birth of the promised Tyr-Ridan, the three who would lead the final battle against Perimal Darkling. Three thousand years have passed since the Kencyrath retreated to Rathillien after a devastating betrayal. Much diminished, they remain outsiders to the native powers of Rathillien.

Jame (Jamethiel), a Highborn woman, flees into Rathillien after years in the Shadows of the last world to fall, her memories incomplete. Gradually discovers that her twin brother Tori, now known as Torisen Black Lord, has regained their father's place as Highlord of the Kencyrath.  She also suspects, from her connection to the destructive side of the Kencyr deity, that she may be one of the Tyr-Ridan.  Her brother and her cousin Kindrie, a healer, seem likely to be the other two, representing Creation and Preservation, respectively. The Kencyrath are by no means at peace, beset by the peoples and powers of Rathillien, riven by divisions between the three people and by the political discord between the nine major Houses of the Highborn.

Behind this story is another one, the betrayal of the Kencyrath by Gerridon Highlord three thousand years earlier on another world.  He and his sister, Jamethiel Dream Weaver, almost destroyed the entire Kencyr host. From his house in the Shadows of the fallen world, Gerridon and his remaining adherents scheme to maintain their immortality, having played no small role in the decline of House Knorth, of which Jame, Tori and Kindrie are the last survivors.  As Tori struggles to find his place as leader of their people, Jame struggles to find a place amongst them and unravels the dark secrets of their heritage she learns Gerridon has plans for her other than as one of the Tyr-Ridan. The three young Knorths are products of Gerridon's dealings to create a replacement for his fading sister, a new Dream Weaver to harvest more Kencyr souls to sustain him, for the Dream Weaver was Tori and Jame's mother, while Gerridon himself sired Kindrie.

Bibliography

God Stalker Chronicles
 God Stalk, 1982
 Dark of the Moon, 1985
 Seeker's Mask, 1994
 To Ride a Rathorn, August 2006
 Bound in Blood, March 2010
 Honor's Paradox, December 2011
 The Sea of Time, June 2014
 The Gates of Tagmeth, August 2017 
 By Demons Possessed, May 2019 
 Deathless Gods, October 2022

 Short story collection
 Blood and Ivory: A Tapestry, 2002: contains some new stories, some previously released (hardcover: ,)
 "Hearts of Woven Shadow"
 "Lost Knots"
 "Among the Dead"
 "Child of Darkness" (Hodgell's first ever story, set in an alternate universe when Jame and the Kencyrath arrive in a world—somewhat like ours—following a holocaust)
 "A Matter of Honor" (the story which provided the genesis for God Stalk)
 "Bones"
 "Stranger Blood" (Hodgell's second story about Jame)
 "A Ballad of the White Plague" (a Sherlock Holmes story)

 Other short stories
 "The Talisman's Trinket" (2011; posted on Baen's web site) 
 "Songs of Waste and Wood" (2014; tie-in with The Sea of Time posted on Baen's web site) 

 Omnibus editions
 Chronicles of the Kencyrath, 1987: contains God Stalk and Dark of the Moon
 Dark of the Gods, 2000: contains God Stalk, Dark of the Moon, and short story Bones
 Godstalker Chronicles, 2006: contains God Stalk, Dark of the Moon, Seeker's Mask, To Ride a Rathorn, and Blood and Ivory: A Tapestry in Baen ebook formats.
 The God Stalker Chronicles, 2009: contains God Stalk and Dark of the Moon
 Seeker's Bane, TBP July 7, 2009 from Baen: contains Seeker's Mask and To Ride a Rathorn

Awards and honors
 1987: Ph.D. in English Literature, University of Minnesota
 Minnesota Fantasy Award
 2008: P. C. Hodgell
 Mythopoeic Fantasy Awards
 1983:  Finalist—God Stalk by P. C. Hodgell
 1986:  Finalist—Dark of the Moon by P. C. Hodgell
 Locus Award
 1981: "Child of Darkness", Nominee for Best Short Story
 1983: God Stalk, Nominee for Best First Novel
 1986: Dark of the Moon, Nominee for Best Fantasy Novel
 Guest of Honor at Arcana 40 in 2010, a dark fantasy convention held in St. Paul, Minnesota
 Special Guest at Minicon 21 (1986), 24 (1989), and 25 (1990)
 Author Guest of Honor at Capricon 10 (1990)

References

External links
 P.C. Hodgell Kencyr Page
 P.C. Hodgell page at In Other Worlds
 Yahoo! group for discussing Hodgell's works 
 Groups.io group for discussing Hodgell's works
 P.C. Hodgell page at her current publisher
 
 Author's website
 Author's LiveJournal

1951 births
Living people
20th-century American novelists
21st-century American novelists
American fantasy writers
American science fiction writers
American women short story writers
American women novelists
Writers from Des Moines, Iowa
University of Minnesota College of Liberal Arts alumni
Novelists from Minnesota
Novelists from Wisconsin
Women science fiction and fantasy writers
20th-century American women writers
21st-century American women writers
20th-century American short story writers
21st-century American short story writers
Novelists from Iowa